Sweyn Forkbeard (17 April 963 – 3 February 1014) was  King of Denmark from 986 until his death, King of England for five weeks from December 1013 until his death, and King of Norway from 999/1000 until 1013/14. He was the father of King Harald II of Denmark, King Cnut the Great, and Queen Estrid Svendsdatter.

In the mid-980s, Sweyn revolted against his father, Harald Bluetooth, and seized the throne. Harald was driven into exile and died shortly afterwards in November 986 or 987. In 1000, with the allegiance of Eric, Earl of Lade, Sweyn ruled most of Norway. In 1013, shortly before his death, he became the first Danish king of the English after a long effort.

Biography

Historiographical sources on Sweyn's life include the Anglo-Saxon Chronicle (where his name is rendered as Swegen), Adam of Bremen's 11th-century Deeds of the Bishops of Hamburg, and Snorri Sturluson's 13th-century Heimskringla. Conflicting accounts of Sweyn's later life also appear in the Encomium Emmae Reginae, an 11th-century Latin encomium in honour of his son king Cnut's queen Emma of Normandy, along with Chronicon ex chronicis by Florence of Worcester, another 11th-century author.

There are conflicting accounts of Sweyn's heritage. One chronicle, Gesta Wulinensis ecclesiae pontificum, only recently discovered in 2019 and written around 990 by Avico, the chaplain of Harald Bluetooth, states that Sweyn was the son of Harald's older brother, Knut Danaást, and Tove. According to this source, Knut Danaást was killed in battle on 17 October 962 and his wife was pregnant with Sweyn at the time. Tove married her brother-in-law Harald in January 963 and Sweyn was born around Easter 963. Harald raised Sweyn as his adopted son. According to Adam of Bremen, Sweyn was the son of Harald Bluetooth and a woman named "Gunhild". When Harald converted to Christianity, Sweyn was baptised "Otto" (in honour of German king Otto I).

Sweyn married the widow of Erik, king of Sweden, named "Gunhild" in some sources, or identified as an unnamed sister of Boleslaus, ruler of Poland.

Historian Ian Howard describes Sweyn as "a competent military commander, politician and diplomat" who made "a formidable and successful king."

Revolt and possible exile
In the mid-980s, Sweyn revolted against his father and seized the throne. Harald was driven into exile and died shortly afterwards in November 986 or 987.

Adam of Bremen depicted Sweyn as a rebellious pagan who persecuted Christians, betrayed his father and expelled German bishops from Scania and Zealand. According to Adam, Sweyn was sent into exile by his father's German friends and deposed in favour of king Eric the Victorious of Sweden, whom Adam wrote ruled Denmark until his death in 994 or 995. Sørensen (2001) argues that Adam's depiction of Sweyn may be overly negative, as seen through an "unsympathetic and intolerant eye".
Adam's account is thus not seen as entirely reliable; the claimed 14 years' exile of Sweyn to Scotland does not seem to agree with Sweyn's building churches in Denmark throughout the same period, including the churches in Lund and Roskilde. According to Adam, Sweyn was punished by God for leading the uprising which led to king Harald's death, and had to spend fourteen years abroad (i.e. 986–1000). The historicity of this exile, or its duration, is uncertain. Adam purports that Sweyn was shunned by all those with whom he sought refuge, but was finally allowed to live for a while in Scotland. Adam also suggests that Sweyn in his youth lived among heathens, and only achieved success as a ruler after accepting Christianity.

Battle of Svolder

Harald Bluetooth had already established a foothold in Norway, controlling Viken in c. 970. He may, however, have lost control over his Norwegian claims following his defeat against a German army in 974.

Sweyn built an alliance with Swedish king Olof Skötkonung and Eirik Hákonarson, Jarl of Lade, against Norwegian king Olaf Tryggvason.
The Kings' sagas ascribe the causes of the alliance to Olaf Tryggvason's ill-fated marriage proposal to Sigrid the Haughty and his problematic marriage to Thyri, sister of Sweyn Forkbeard. According to the sagas, Sigrid pushed Sweyn into war with Olaf because Olaf had slapped her.

The allies attacked and defeated king Olaf in the western Baltic Sea when he was sailing home from an expedition, in the Battle of Svolder, fought in September of either 999 or 1000. The victors divided Norway among them. According to the account of the Heimskringla, Sweyn regained direct control of Viken district.

King Olaf of Sweden received four districts in Trondheim as well as Møre, Romsdal and Rånrike (the Fagrskinna, by contrast, says that the Swedish part consisted of Oppland and a part of Trondheim). He gave these to his son in law, Jarl Svein Hákonarson, to hold as a vassal. The rest of Norway was ruled by Eirik Hákonarson as King Svein's vassal.

The Jarls Eirik and Svein proved strong, competent rulers, and their reign was prosperous. Most sources say that they adopted Christianity but allowed the people religious freedom, leading to a backlash against Christianity which undid much of Olaf Tryggvason's missionary work.

Religion
Sweyn apparently recruited priests and bishops from England, in preference to the Archbishopric of Bremen. In part, this reflected the fact that there were numerous Christian priests of Danish origin in the Danelaw, while Sweyn had few personal connections to Germany. However, Sweyn's preference for the English church may also have had a political motive, because German bishops were an integral part of the state. It has been suggested that Sweyn was seeking to pre-empt any diminution of his independence by German leaders. This may have been a reason for Adam of Bremen's apparent hostility in his accounts of Sweyn; by accentuating English ecclesiastical influence in his kingdom, Sweyn was effectively spurning the Archbishop of Bremen.

Invasions of England
The "Chronicle of John of Wallingford" (c. 1225–1250) records Sweyn's involvement in raids against England during 1002–1005, 1006–1007 and 1009–1012 to avenge the St. Brice's Day massacre of England's Danish inhabitants in November 1002. According to Ashley (1998), Sweyn's invasion was partly motivated by the massacre of Danes in England ordered by Æthelred the Unready in 1002, in which his sister and brother-in-law are said to have been killed, but Lund (2001) argues that the main motivation for the raids was more likely the prospect of revenue.

At the outset of the invasions, Sweyn negotiated an agreement with Duke Richard II of Normandy whereby the Danes gained permission to sell their spoils of war in Normandy.

Sweyn campaigned in Wessex and East Anglia in 1003–1004, but a famine forced him to return to Denmark in 1005. Further raids took place in 1006–1007, and in 1009–1012 Thorkell the Tall led a Viking invasion into England. Simon Keynes regards it as uncertain whether Sweyn supported these invasions, but "whatever the case, he was quick to exploit the disruption caused by the activities of Thorkell's army".
Sweyn acquired massive sums of Danegeld through the raids. In 1013, he is reported to have personally led his forces in a full-scale invasion of England.

The medieval Peterborough Chronicle (part of the Anglo-Saxon Chronicle) states:
before the month of August came king Sweyn with his fleet to Sandwich. He went very quickly about East Anglia into the Humber's mouth, and so upward along the Trent till he came to Gainsborough. Earl Uchtred and all Northumbria quickly bowed to him, as did all the people of the Kingdom of Lindsey, then the people of the Five Boroughs. He was given hostages from each shire. When he understood that all the people had submitted to him, he bade that his force should be provisioned and horsed; he went south with the main part of the invasion force, while some of the invasion force, as well as the hostages, were with his son Cnut. After he came over Watling Street, they went to Oxford, and the town-dwellers soon bowed to him, and gave hostages. From there they went to Winchester, and the people did the same, then eastward to London.

But the Londoners put up a strong resistance, because King Æthelred and Thorkell the Tall, a Viking leader who had defected to Æthelred, personally held their ground against him in London itself. Sweyn then went west to Bath, where the western thanes submitted to him and gave hostages. The Londoners then followed suit, fearing Sweyn's revenge if they resisted any longer. King Æthelred sent his sons Edward and Alfred to Normandy, and himself spent Christmas on the Isle of Wight, and then followed them into exile. 

Based in Gainsborough, Lincolnshire, Sweyn began to organise his vast new kingdom, but he died there on 3 February 1014, having ruled England for only five weeks. Sweyn's cause of death is unknown. Some theorise that he was killed, whereas other sources say he died after falling off a horse. His embalmed body was returned to Denmark for burial in the church he had built. Tradition locates this church in Roskilde, but it is more plausible that it was actually located in Lund in Scania (now part of Sweden).

Aftermath
Sweyn's elder son, Harald II, succeeded him as King of Denmark, while his younger son, Cnut, was proclaimed King of England by the people of the Danelaw. However, the English nobility sent for Æthelred, who upon his return from exile in Normandy in the spring of 1014 managed to drive Cnut out of England. Cnut soon returned and became king of all England in 1016, following the deaths of Æthelred and his son Edmund Ironside; he succeeded his brother as King of Denmark in 1019 and eventually also ruled Norway, parts of Sweden, Pomerania and Schleswig.

Cnut and his sons, Harold Harefoot and Harthacnut, ruled England over a combined 26-year period (1016–1042). After Harthacnut's death, the English throne reverted to the House of Wessex under Æthelred's younger son Edward the Confessor (reigned 1042–1066).

Sweyn's daughter, Estrid Svendsdatter, was the mother of King Sweyn II of Denmark. Her descendants continue to reign in Denmark to this day. One of them, Margaret of Denmark, married James III of Scotland in 1469, introducing Sweyn's bloodline into the Scottish royal house. After James VI of Scotland inherited the English throne in 1603, Sweyn's descendants became monarchs of England again.

Issue
The Chronicon of Thietmar of Merseburg and the Encomium Emmae report Cnut's mother as having been Świętosława, a daughter of Mieszko I of Poland. Norse sources of the High Middle Ages, most prominently Heimskringla by Snorri Sturluson, also give a Polish princess as Cnut's mother, whom they call Gunhild and a daughter of Burislav, the king of Vindland. Since in the Norse sagas the king of Vindland is always Burislav, this is reconcilable with the assumption that her father was Mieszko (not his son Bolesław). Adam of Bremen in Gesta Hammaburgensis ecclesiae pontificum is unique in equating Cnut's mother (for whom he also produces no name) with the former queen of Sweden, wife of Eric the Victorious and by this marriage mother of Olof Skötkonung. To complicate the matter, Heimskringla and other sagas also have Sweyn marrying Eric's widow, but she is distinctly another person in these texts, named Sigrid the Haughty, whom Sweyn only marries after Gunhild, the Slavic princess who bore Cnut, has died. Different theories regarding the number and ancestry of Sweyn's wives (or wife) have been advanced (see Sigrid the Haughty and Gunhild). But since Adam is the only source to equate the identity of Cnut's and Olof Skötkonung's mother, this is often seen as an error on Adam's part, and it is often assumed that Sweyn had two wives, the first being Cnut's mother, and the second being the former Queen of Sweden. Cnut's brother Harald was the youngest of the two brothers, according to Encomium Emmae.

Sweyn had eight children with Sigrid the Haughty and Gunhild of Wenden:
Harald II of Denmark
Cnut the Great
Estrid Svendsdatter
Gytha
Gunnhild
Santslaue
Thyra

References

External links

 Sweyn at the official website of the British monarchy
 
Northvegr (Scandinavian) – A History of the Vikings (Search) 
Vikingworld (Danish) – Swein Forkbeard (Svend Tveskæg)
 Sweyn Forkbeard: The Viking King of England on Medieval Archives Podcast

960s births
1014 deaths
11th-century English monarchs
10th-century kings of Denmark
11th-century kings of Denmark
10th-century Norwegian monarchs
11th-century Norwegian monarchs
Viking warriors
Anglo-Norse monarchs
Burials at Roskilde Cathedral
Danish Christians
House of Knýtlinga
Monarchs of England before 1066
11th-century Vikings
10th-century Vikings